François Goasduff (born 27 April 1935) is a French racing cyclist. He rode in the 1962 Tour de France.

References

1935 births
Living people
French male cyclists
Place of birth missing (living people)